Rafael Palomar (born 19 July 1951 in Ciudad Juárez, Chihuahua) is a Mexican former basketball player who competed in the 1976 Summer Olympics.

References

1951 births
Living people
Basketball players at the 1976 Summer Olympics
Basketball players at the 1983 Pan American Games
Cameron Aggies men's basketball players
Junior college men's basketball players in the United States
Mexican men's basketball players
Milwaukee Bucks draft picks
Olympic basketball players of Mexico
San Antonio Spurs draft picks
Sportspeople from Ciudad Juárez
Texas Tech Red Raiders basketball players
Basketball players from Chihuahua
Pan American Games medalists in basketball
Pan American Games bronze medalists for Mexico
Mexican expatriate basketball people in the United States
Medalists at the 1983 Pan American Games